The Longest Summer is Hong Kong independent director Fruit Chan's second feature in the "1997 trilogy", first released in 1998.  The first film in the trilogy is Made in Hong Kong.  The movie details the problem faced by a group of disaffected Hong Kong ex-soldiers of the British Army, just before and after the 1997 handover by the People's Republic of China.

Plot 
Ga Yin (Tony Ho Wah-Chiu), a former sergeant in the British Army, is discharged from his post following the imminent handover of Hong Kong to the People's Republic of China in July 1997. He joins his younger brother Ga Suen (Sam Lee) to work for the underworld, as a chauffeur to a Triad leader.  Owing to the financial difficulties faced by his former army mates, he decides to mastermind a bank robbery with his brother and his four army pals.  But on the day they are robbing the bank, they realize another gang is working on the same plans too.

Cast 
 Tony Ho - Ga Yin
 Sam Lee - Ga Suen

Awards
The film received eight nominations at the 18th Annual Hong Kong Film Awards, but won none.  These are:
Nomination - Best Picture
Nomination - Best Director (Fruit Chan Gor)
Nomination - Best Supporting Actor (Sam Lee Chan-Sam)
Nomination - Best Screenplay (Fruit Chan Gor)
Nomination - Best New Artist (Tony Ho Wah-Chiu)
Nomination - Best New Artist (Jo Koo)
Nomination - Best Original Score (Lam Wah-Cheun, Bat Kwok-Chi)
Nomination - Best Original Song ("Hui Nin Yin Fa Dut Bit Dor", performed by Andy Lau Tak-Wah)

The film is also one of the ten recommended films of the 5th Annual Hong Kong Film Critics Society Awards.

References

External links

 Review of The Longest Summer at lovehkfilm.com
 HK cinemagic entry
 DVD Review
 The Longest Summer at rottentomatoes.com
 The Longest Summer at variety.com
 The Longest Summer at fareastfilm.com

1998 films
Hong Kong war drama films
Films directed by Fruit Chan
1990s Hong Kong films